Austromitra retrocurvata is a species of small sea snail, marine gastropod mollusc in the family Costellariidae, the ribbed miters.

Description

Distribution

References

 Turner H. (2001) Katalog der Familie Costellariidae Macdonald 1860 (Gastropoda: Prosobranchia: Muricoidea). Hackenheim: Conchbooks. 100 pp. page(s): 55

External links
 Verco, J.C. 1909. Notes on South Australian marine Mollusca with descriptions of new species. Part XII. Transactions of the Royal Society of South Australia 33: 293–342

retrocurvata
Gastropods described in 1909